Stephanie Skegas-Maxwell (born 30 August 1968) is a Greek softball player. She competed in the women's tournament at the 2004 Summer Olympics. At the collegiate level she played for the Nebraska Cornhuskers.

References

External links
 

1968 births
Living people
Greek softball players
Olympic softball players of Greece
Softball players at the 2004 Summer Olympics
Sportspeople from Torrance, California
Softball players from California
Nebraska Cornhuskers softball players